South Pyongan Province is a province of North Korea. The province was formed in 1896 from the southern half of the former Pyongan Province, remained a province of Korea until 1945, then became a province of North Korea. Its capital is Pyongsong.

Geography

The province is bordered by North Pyongan and Chagang Provinces to the north, South Hamgyong and Kangwon Provinces to the east and southeast and North Hwanghae Province and Pyongyang to the south. The Yellow Sea and Korea Bay are located to the west.

Administrative divisions
South P'yŏngan is divided into 1 special city (tŭkpyŏlsi); 5 cities (si); 16 counties (kun); and 3 districts (1 ku and 2 chigu).

Its administrative divisions are:

Cities
 Nampo Special City (남포특별시/; created in 2010)
 Pyongsong (평성시/; the provincial capital, established December 1969)
 Anju (안주시/; established August 1987)
 Kaechon (개천시/; established August 1990)
 Sunchon-si (순천시/; established October 1983)
 Tokchon (덕천시/; established June 1986)

Counties
 Chungsan County (증산군/)
 Hoechang County (회창군/)
 Maengsan County (맹산군/)
 Mundok County (문덕군/)
 Nyongwon County (녕원군/)
 Onchon County (온천군/)
 Pukchang County (북창군/)
 Pyongwon County (평원군/)
 Ryonggang County (룡강군/)
 Sinyang County (신양군/)
 Songchon County (성천군/)
 Sukchon County (숙천군/)
 Taehung County (대흥군/)
 Taedong County (대동군/)
 Unsan County (은산군/)
 Yangdok County (양덕군/)

Districts
 Chongnam (청남구/)
 Tukchang (득장지구/)
 Ungok (운곡지구/)

The below former counties of South Pyongan were merged with Nampo in 2004 and are administered as part of that city:
 Chollima-guyok (천리마군/)
 Kangso-guyok (강서군/)
 Ryonggang County (룡강군/)
 Taean-guyok-gun (대안군/)
In 2010 the following county was merged with Nampo:
 Onchon County (온천군/)

Gallery

See also

 Geography of North Korea

References

 행정 구역 현황 (Haengjeong Guyeok Hyeonhwang;) (in Korean only)
 
 Administrative divisions of North Korea (in simplified Chinese; used as reference for Hanja)

 
Provinces of North Korea